Barter may refer to:

Business
Barter, a type of trade, either between individuals or organizations, using goods and services rather than money.

Music
Barter 6, by Young Thug, 2015

People
Barter (surname)

Places
Barter Island in Alaska